Fight to be Free  may refer to:

"Fight to be Free", song by Nuclear Assault 1988
Fight to be Free, EP by The Hoax (band) 2009
"Fight to Be Free", Shadow Warriors cover on Maximum Overload (DragonForce album)